Corey Domachowski (born 11 September 1996) is a Welsh rugby union player who plays for the Cardiff Rugby at prop.

Domachowski made his debut for Cardiff in 2017 having previously played for the academy team. The Church Village-born loosehead prop represented Wales at under-20 level, and featured for Cardiff Rugby as a replacement in Challenge Cup quarter final defeat to Gloucester in 2017.

References

External links 
Cardiff Blues profile

1996 births
Living people
Cardiff Rugby players
Rugby union players from Church Village
Welsh rugby union players
Rugby union props